USS Knickerbocker (SP-479), was a United States Navy tug, minesweeper, and dispatch ship in commission from 1917 to 1919.

Construction and acquisition
Knickerbocker was built as a commercial tug of the same name in 1873 by Neafie & Levy at Philadelphia, Pennsylvania. She was rebuilt in 1904.

The U.S. Navy leased Knickerbocker from her owner, the Cornell Steamboat Company of New York City, on 2 May 1917 for use during World War I and enrolled her in the Navy Coast Defense Reserve, then purchased her outright from Cornell Steamboat on 13 September 1917. She was commissioned at New York City as USS Knickerbocker (SP-479) on 22 September 1917 .

Operational history
Assigned to the 3rd Naval District, Knickerbocker operated on the Hudson River and in New York Harbor as a minesweeper, tug, and dispatch ship.

Though Knickerbocker was ordered stricken from the Navy List on 14 March 1918 due to her poor material condition and accordingly was stricken on 16 March 1918, a scarcity of tugs resulted in her retention for harbor duty, and she was reinstated on the Navy List in April 1918.

On 30 December 1918, Knickerbocker was assigned as tender to the training and guard ship  and served as a dispatch ship.

Disposal
Knickerbocker was decommissioned on 18 February 1919 and was sold the same day to Francis J. McDonald of Ardmore, Pennsylvania.

References

Department of the Navy Naval History and Heritage Command Online Library of Selected Images: Civilian Ships: Knickerbocker (Harbor Tug, 1873). Served as USS Knickerbocker (SP-479) in 1917–1919
NavSource Online: Section Patrol Craft Photo Archive: Knickerbocker (SP 479)

Auxiliary ships of the United States Navy
World War I auxiliary ships of the United States
Minesweepers of the United States Navy
Ships built by Neafie and Levy
World War I minesweepers of the United States
1873 ships